Pinjada Ko Suga is a 1917 Nepali-language Hindu allegory poem by Lekhnath Paudyal.

Background 
Pinjada Ko Suga is described as an "allegory with a dual meaning". The poem also contains Hindu religious verses, and double entendres to Brum Shumsher – the poet's employer. It is one of the most famous poems in Nepal.

Text

Translation

Adaptation 
Pinjada Ko Suga was adapted into a song with the same title by Nepali rock band 1974 AD.

References 

1917 poems
Nepalese poems
Hindu poetry
Poems about birds